The 2013–14 season was Puskás FC's 1st season in the Nemzeti Bajnokság I (took right to the departure from Felcsút FC) and 3rd year in existence as a football club.

First team squad

Transfers

Summer

In:

Out:

Winter

In:

Out:

List of Hungarian football transfers summer 2013
List of Hungarian football transfers winter 2013–14

Statistics

Appearances and goals
Last updated on 1 June 2014.

|-
|colspan="14"|Youth players:

|-
|colspan="14"|Out to loan:

|-
|colspan="14"|Players no longer at the club:

|}

Top scorers
Includes all competitive matches. The list is sorted by shirt number when total goals are equal.

Last updated on 1 June 2014

Disciplinary record
Includes all competitive matches. Players with 1 card or more included only.

Last updated on 1 June 2014

Overall
{|class="wikitable"
|-
|Games played || 43 (30 OTP Bank Liga, 3 Hungarian Cup and 10 Hungarian League Cup)
|-
|Games won || 16 (8 OTP Bank Liga, 2 Hungarian Cup and 6 Hungarian League Cup)
|-
|Games drawn || 10 (7 OTP Bank Liga, 1 Hungarian Cup and 2 Hungarian League Cup)
|-
|Games lost || 17 (15 OTP Bank Liga, 0 Hungarian Cup and 2 Hungarian League Cup)
|-
|Goals scored || 62
|-
|Goals conceded || 66
|-
|Goal difference || -4
|-
|Yellow cards || 84
|-
|Red cards || 12
|-
|rowspan="1"|Worst discipline ||  Márk Tamás (6 , 2 )
|-
|rowspan="1"|Best result || 4–0 (H) v Mezőkövesd – OTP Bank Liga – 22-03-2014
|-
|rowspan="1"|Worst result || 0–4 (H) v Budapest Honvéd – OTP Bank Liga – 08-03-2014
|-
|rowspan="1"|Most appearances ||  Patrik Tischler (34 appearances)
|-
|rowspan="1"|Top scorer ||  László Lencse (21 goals)
|-
|Points || 58/129 (44.96%)
|-

Nemzeti Bajnokság I

Matches

Classification

Results summary

Results by round

Hungarian Cup

League Cup

Group stage

Classification

Knockout phase

Pre-season

References

External links
 Puskás FC
 Official Website
 fixtures and results

Puskás Akadémia FC seasons
Hungarian football clubs 2013–14 season